The National Botanic Garden of Wales is a botanical garden located in Llanarthney in the River Tywi valley, Carmarthenshire, Wales.

The National Botanic Garden of Wales seeks "to develop a viable world-class national botanic garden dedicated to the research and conservation of biodiversity, lifelong learning and the enjoyment of the visitor." The garden is a registered charity reliant upon funding from visitors, friends, grants and gifts. Significant start-up costs were shared with the UK Millennium Fund.

History of the site

The Middleton family built a mansion here in the early 17th century. In 1789 Sir William Paxton bought the estate for £40,000 to create a water park. He used his great wealth to employ some of the finest creative minds of his day, including the eminent architect Samuel Pepys Cockerell, whom he commissioned to design and build a new Middleton Hall, turning the original one into a farm. The new Middleton Hall became ‘one of the most splendid mansions in South Wales’ which ‘far eclipsed the proudest of the Cambrian mansions in Asiatic pomp and splendour’.

Paxton created an ingenious water park. Water flowed around the estate via a system of interconnecting lakes, ponds and streams linked by a network of dams, water sluices, bridges and cascades. Spring water was stored in elevated reservoirs that fed into a lead cistern on the mansion's roof, allowing Paxton's residence to enjoy piped running water and the very latest luxury, water closets. The park, which includes the National Botanical Garden, is registered, under Middleton Hall, at Grade II* on the Cadw/ICOMOS Register of Parks and Gardens of Special Historic Interest in Wales. 

In 1806, Paxton engaged Pepys Cockerell again to design and then oversee the construction of Paxton's Tower on the estate, which was completed in 1809. A Neo-Gothic folly erected in honour of Lord Nelson, it is situated on a hilltop near Llanarthney in the Towy Valley. Today the folly is now owned by the National Trust.

The sale agents engaged that year described the estate thus in their catalogue:

Middleton Hall estate was sold to Jamaican-born West India merchant, Edward Hamlin Adams, for £54,700. Adams, neither a gardener nor a lover of water features, added buildings that aided his love of country sports, but let the bath houses fall into disrepair. Of the gardens, only those immediately visible from the house were maintained.

In 1842 the estate passed into the hands of his eccentric son Edward, who immediately changed his name from Adams into the Welsh form Abadam. Not loving the country or gardens, according to his estate manager Thomas Cooke, Edward was a social nightmare. As his son predeceased him, on his death in 1875 the estate passed to his eldest daughter, Lucy, then next sister Adah who had married into the local Hughes family. In 1919 the estate changed hands again when Major William J. H. Hughes sold it to Colonel William N. Jones.

Edward Abadam's youngest daughter, Alice, was a leading suffragist, and a blue plaque to her was unveiled in 2018, the centenary of women's suffrage, in the gardens of what had been Middleton Hall, her childhood home, by her great-niece Margaret Vaughan.

In 1931, the mansion was completely gutted by fire, leaving only the walls standing, themselves covered in globules of molten lead from the melted roof. After this the estate fell into decline, and 20 years later the walls of the main house were pulled down. The site was then bought by Carmarthenshire County Council, and leased to young farmers hoping to make their way into an agricultural career.  A tree on the site, known as the Llanarthne oak, was almost cut down at this time during the clearance of a paddock on one of the farms. It survived and in 2016 was named as Wales's Tree of the Year.

History of the garden

In 1978, interest had been captured by local walkers, who were keen to revive the splendour of what they could see around them. Setting up a fund raising scheme, the little money raised led to the rediscovery of a number of historical features.

The idea for a National Botanic Garden of Wales originated from the Welsh artist, William Wilkins, whose aunt had described to him the ruins of an elaborate water feature she had discovered while walking in the local woods at Pont Felin Gat. Under the guidance of the Welsh Historic Gardens Trust, an application was made to the Millennium Commission to fund Britain's first national botanic garden for 200 years.

Virtually on the site of Cockerell's mansion, the Great Glasshouse now forms the centrepiece. Much of the original waterscape has been restored, and extended by introducing cascades to the western approach to the Glasshouse. The extraordinary original view the east side of the mansion offered over the grounds has been restored, extending as originally to Paxton's Tower in the distance. Many experts have commented that this view gives visitors an ability to see and hence understand something of what the great landscape architects of the end of the eighteenth century understood by the word "picturesque".

The garden was opened to the public for the first time on 24 May 2000, and was officially opened on 21 July by Charles, Prince of Wales. Foster and Partners won the Gold Medal for Architecture at the National Eisteddfod of Wales of 2000 for their work on the Great Glasshouse. In 2003, the garden ran into serious financial difficulties, and in 2004 it accepted a financial package from the Welsh Assembly Government, Carmarthenshire County Council and the Millennium Commission to secure its future.

Twenty-first century approaches to recycling and conservation have been used in the design of the centre: biomass recycling is used to provide heating for some of the facilities such as the visitor centre and glasshouses.

With many plant exhibits now fully mature, and exhibits and activities to attract younger visitors, three quarters of income is now self-generated, with the remaining quarter in grants. In 2019, there were 160,000 visitors, quoted as being a "sustainable average".

Botanical collections

Constructed virtually on the same site as Paxton's new but now demolished Middleton Hall, the Great Glasshouse, designed by Foster and Partners, is the largest structure of its kind in the world. Housing plants from several Mediterranean climate regions, the plants are divided into sections from Chile, Western Australia, South Africa, California, the Canary Islands and the Mediterranean itself.

The Double Walled Garden has been rebuilt from the ruins, and is being developed to house a wide variety of plants, including a modern interpretation of a kitchen garden in one quarter, and ornamental beds to display the classification and evolution of all flowering plant families in the other three quarters.

In 2007, a new tropical glasshouse, designed by Welsh architect John Belle, was opened to continue the classification displays with tropical monocotyledons.

In 2015 a large collection of Welsh apple varieties was planted. A Welsh pomona (annotated survey) is planned.

Waun Las national nature reserve

Use in television 
The domed greenhouse scenes of the Doctor Who episode The Waters of Mars (2009), were filmed in the glasshouse of the garden.

See also

 List of gardens in Wales
 Tourism in Wales

Notes

External links

 

Greenhouses in the United Kingdom
Botanical gardens in Wales
Parks in Carmarthenshire
Registered historic parks and gardens in Carmarthenshire
Buildings and structures in Carmarthenshire
Foster and Partners buildings
National nature reserves in Wales
Welsh Eisteddfod Gold Medal winners